This is a list of 103 species in the genus Listronotus.

Listronotus species

References